John Chaffee may refer to:

John Chaffee (1823–1903), American gold miner who lived with his same-sex partner for over 50 years, see John Chaffee and Jason Chamberlain 
John W. Chaffee (born 1948), American historian of China

See also
John Chafee (1922–1999), American politician from Rhode Island